Jacob Sommer Simonsen (born 1 January 1995) is a Danish long-distance runner.

In 2019, he competed in the senior men's race at the 2019 IAAF World Cross Country Championships held in Aarhus, Denmark. He finished in 93rd place. In the same year, he also represented Denmark at the 2019 Summer Universiade held in Naples, Italy. He finished in 13th place in the men's half marathon and he won the bronze medal in the men's marathon team event.

References

External links 
 

Living people
1995 births
Place of birth missing (living people)
Danish male long-distance runners
Danish male cross country runners
Universiade medalists in athletics (track and field)
Universiade bronze medalists for Denmark
Medalists at the 2019 Summer Universiade